Lauri Resik (born 28 November 1969) is an Estonian cyclist. He competed in the men's individual road race at the 1996 Summer Olympics.

References

External links
 

1969 births
Living people
Estonian male cyclists
Olympic cyclists of Estonia
Cyclists at the 1996 Summer Olympics
Sportspeople from Tallinn